Jorge David Glas Espinel (born 13 September 1969) is an Ecuadorian politician and electrical engineer. He served as Vice President of Ecuador from 24 May 2013 to 13 December 2017.  President Lenín Moreno suspended Glas of his official duties as Vice President on 3 August 2017. In December 2017, Glas was sentenced to six years imprisonment by a Criminal Tribunal of the National Court of Justice, for receiving over $13.5 million in bribes in the Odebrecht scandal. He was released from prison on 10 April 2022.

Personal life
Jorge Glas was born 13 September 1969 in Guayaquil. He has known and been friends with President Rafael Correa since their time as boy scouts.

Education
He holds a degree in electrical and electronics engineering from the ESPOL which he obtained on 22 September 2008. National Assembly member for the Patriotic Society Party, Galo Lara, reported Glas on 3 January 2013 to the police for plagiarism in his thesis and for holding public office while not being qualified to do so. Lara said that Glas during his term as General Manager of the Solidarity Fund needed an academic title of the third degree, which Glas did not have. Glas's thesis was reviewed by Genove Gneco, a professor from the Dominican Republic who found suspected plagiarism in four theses by top governmental officials in his own country, including then-President Danilo Medina. Gneco found 35% of Glas's thesis to be suspected plagiarism. An investigation by a commission set up by ESPOL acquitted Glas of plagiarism. Glas however recognized that he should have cited his sources better.

Since 2007 Glas has held several political appointments in the government of Rafael Correa. He was general manager of the now-closed Solidarity Fund between 2007 and 2009. The company was an amalgamation of several public companies of telecommunications and electricity generation and distribution. He was also president of the National Telecommunications Council.

Afterwards Glas was Minister of Telecommunications and later became Coordinating Minister of Strategic Sectors. He directed the merger of Andinatel S.A. and Pacifitel S.A. into the National Corporation of Telecommunications, a corporation of which he became the first chairperson.

As Coordinating Minister of Strategic Sectors he was responsible for building several hydroelectric stations.

Vice Presidency
Glas commenced his term as Vice President on 24 May 2013.

On 4 August 2017, Glas was suspended from his duties as Vice President.

Prison sentences 

On December 15, 2017, Glas was sentenced to six years in prison for taking $13.5 million from Brazilian conglomerate Odebrecht.

On 2 January 2018, under Ecuador's Constitution's Article 146, as Glas was unable to exercise his office for 90 days, he was stripped of his office. On 6 January 2018, María Alejandra Vicuña was formally sworn in as Vice President of Ecuador after the National Assembly voted to approve her for the position.

In October 2019, The National Supreme Court of Justice reaffirmed his six-year prison sentence. Glas has been imprisoned in Latacunga, south of Quito, since 2017.

In April 2020, ex-vice president Jorge Glas was sentenced to 8 years in prison for aggravated bribery by a Court of the National Court of Justice. In addition, he lost his political rights for 25 years.

In January 2021, Ecuador's Superior Court added him another sentence of eight years in prison for misuse of public funds in an oil contract.

He was granted Habeas corpus on April 10, 2022, which allowed him to be released on parole for 40 days, which was revoked by a court in the province of Santa Elena, with which Jorge Glas was imprisoned again.

References

Notes 

1969 births
Living people
People from Guayaquil
Vice presidents of Ecuador
Government ministers of Ecuador
PAIS Alliance politicians
People involved in plagiarism controversies
Catholic socialists
Ecuadorian politicians convicted of crimes
Heads of government who were later imprisoned